White Deer Plain may refer to:

White Deer Plain (novel), a 1993 Chinese novel by Chen Zhongshi
White Deer Plain (film), a 2011 Chinese film based on Chen's novel
White Deer Plain (TV series), a 2017 Chinese TV series based on Chen's novel